Curling at the 1998 Winter Olympics took place at Karuizawa, who had hosted the equestrian events at the 1964 Summer Olympics in Tokyo. The 1998 Nagano Olympics marked the first time that curling was held as an official Olympic sport. It was the first time the same city hosted events for both the Summer and Winter Olympics.

Medal summary

Medal table

Events

Men's

Teams

Final standings

Results
All times shown are in Japan Standard Time

Draw 1
9 February, 14:00

Draw 2
10 February, 9:00

Draw 3
10 February, 19:00

Draw 4
11 February, 14:00

Draw 5
12 February, 9:00

Draw 6
12 February, 19:00

Draw 7
13 February, 14:00

Tie-breaker 1
13 February, 19:00

Tie-breaker 2
14 February, 9:00

Medal round

Semi-finals
14 February, 18:00

Bronze medal game
15 February, 9:00

Gold medal game
15 February, 17:00

Top 5 player percentages

Women's

Teams

Standings

Results
All times shown are in Japan Standard Time

Draw 1
9 February, 9:00

Draw 2
9 February, 19:00

Draw 3
10 February, 14:00

Draw 4
11 February, 9:00

Draw 5
11 February, 19:00

Draw 6
12 February, 14:00

Draw 7
13 February, 9:00

Medal round

Semi-finals
14 February, 14:00

Bronze medal game
15 February, 9:00

Gold medal game
15 February, 13:00

Top 5 player percentages

References

Official Olympic Report
Wallechinshky, David and Jaime Loucky (2009). "Curling: Men". In The Complete Book of the Winter Olympics: 2010 Edition. London: Aurum Press Limited. p. 150.

 
1998 Winter Olympics events
1998
1998 in curling
International curling competitions hosted by Japan
Men's events at the 1998 Winter Olympics
Women's events at the 1998 Winter Olympics